Kord-e Shami (also Romanized as Kord-e Shāmī and Kard Shāmī; also known as Kord-e Shāhī) is a village in Dowrahan Rural District, Gandoman District, Borujen County, Chaharmahal and Bakhtiari Province, Iran. At the 2006 census, its population was 727, in 153 families. The village is populated by Kurds.

References 

Populated places in Borujen County
Luri settlements in Chaharmahal and Bakhtiari Province